Tatenda Mupunga (born 24 April 1987) is a Zimbabwean cricketer who has played for Mashonaland Eagles and Mountaineers.

References

External links
 

1987 births
Living people
Zimbabwean cricketers
Sportspeople from Harare
Mashonaland Eagles cricketers
Mountaineers cricketers